Lepidocoleidae is a family of polychaetes belonging to the order Phyllodocida. 

Lepidocoleidaes have an armor-like exoskeleton that consists of large enclosed mineralized calcite plates with two different crystalline layers with both rugae and growth lines on their external surface.

Genera:
 Carnicoleus Dzik, 1986
 Clarkeolepis Elias, 1958
 Compacoleus Schallreuter, 1985
 Kerrycoleus Prokop, 2002
 Lepidocoleus Faber, 1886
 Sokolophocoleus Pope, 1960
 Turrilepas Woodward, 1865

References
3. Gügel, De Baets, K., Jerjen, I., Schuetz, P., & Klug, C. (2017). A new subdisarticulated machaeridian from the Middle Devonian of China: Insights into taphonomy and taxonomy using X-ray     

microtomography and 3D-analysis. Acta Palaeontologica Polonica, 62(2), 237–247. https://doi.org/10.4202/app.00346.2017

4. Pereira, Colmenar, J., Mortier, J., Vanmeirhaeghe, J., Verniers, J., Štorch, P., Taylor Harper, D. A., & Gutiérrez-Marco, J. C. (2021). Hirnantia Fauna from the Condroz Inlier, Belgium: another case of a   

relict Ordovician shelly fauna in the Silurian? Journal of Paleontology, 95(6), 1189–1215. https://doi.org/10.1017/      jpa.2021.74

      5. Vinther, & Briggs, D. E. . (2009). Machaeridian locomotion. Lethaia, 42(3), 357–364. https://doi.org/10.1111/j.1502-3931.2009.00165.x

Phyllodocida